The 2010–11 Tunisian Ligue Professionnelle 1(Tunisian Professional League)  season was the 85th season of top-tier football in Tunisia. The competition began on 24 July 2010, and will conclude on 8 May 2011. The defending champions from the previous season are Espérance Sportive de Tunis. No teams were relegated as Ligue 1 was to be extended to 16 teams starting from the 2011–12 season.

Team movements

Teams relegated to CPL-2 
AS Kasserine
US Monastir

Teams promoted from CPL-2 
AS Gabès
AS Marsa

Teams and venues

Results

League table

Result table

Leaders

Top goalscorers

Update: 6 July 2011
Source: Soccerway

External links
 2010–11 Ligue 1 on RSSSF.com

Tun
Tunisian Ligue Professionnelle 1 seasons
1